Unofficial South American Championships in Athletics were held in
Santiago, Chile in 1957.   The athletics meeting was for men only.

Men

Medal Table (unofficial)

Team Scores (Official)

References

External links
gbrathletics.com

U 1957
1957 in Chilean sport
1957 in athletics (track and field)
International athletics competitions hosted by Chile
1957 in South American sport